Vaios Karagiannis (born 25 June 1968) is a former Greek professional footballer who played as a defender and current manager.

Club career
Karagiannis started from Enippea Iteas Karditsa and then went to A.O. Karditsa, where he played until the summer of 1990. That summer, AEK Athens acquired him as a completely unknown young footballer at the time. However, Dušan Bajević immediately gave opportunities to the young defender, placing him mainly on the left side of the defense. Finally he managed to establish himself in the team's starting eleven and slowly impressed from time to time, mainly with his defensive style, his fast pace, his very good jump and with "acrobatic" moves. He was a very reliable solution in all positions of the defense. He did very well against the Romário in the European Cup matches against Eindhoven in 1993. The most memorable moment of his career was the tackle on the head of the Brazilian striker for a contest for the ball in the air, in the second match. He was a regular at AEK until 1994, when Michalis Kasapis was established as a left back-half in the team, but even then he made many appearances either as a started or as a substitution. With AEK he won 3 championships, 4 cups and 1 Super cup. After AEK, he played for Poseidon Neon Poron in 2002 and then ended his career in 2006 by returning to Anagennisi Karditsa.

International career
He played for Greece national team, and was a participant at the 1994 FIFA World Cup, where he played in two matches.

After football
He then followed a coaching career, first at Anagennisi Karditsa, of which he was coach from 2006 to 2008. In December 2008, he took over as coach of AO Trikala, until March 2009. He briefly returned to A.O. Karditsa, while in the period 2010–11 again in the Anagennisi Karditsa, collaboration which ended on November 22, 2011, while continuing the 2012–13 season as a coach at A.O. Karditsa. The continuation of his cooperation was announced, but it was terminated in September 2013, due to the exclusion from the Cup and the bad image in the preparatory games. In the summer of 2014 he coached Atromitos Palamas for one and a half season. He also managed Apollon Makrychori, from July 2017 until November 2018, when he resigned.

In 2010 he participated in the elections in 2010 as a candidate councilor of the Municipality of Palamas with the combination of (then elected mayor 2010–2014) Konstantinos Patsialis "Unified Municipal Movement of Palamas", was elected to the Municipal Council 6th with 760 votes, while in January 2013 he was appointed Deputy Mayor.

Honours

AEK Athens 
Alpha Ethniki: 1991–92, 1992–93, 1993–94
Greek Cup: 1995–96, 1996–97, 1999–2000, 2001–02
Greek Super Cup: 1996
Greek League Cup: 1990
Pre-Mediterranean Cup: 1991

References

External links

Profile at Onsports.gr
Weltfussball 

1968 births
Living people
Greek footballers
Greece international footballers
Association football central defenders
Anagennisi Karditsa F.C. players
AEK Athens F.C. players
Super League Greece players
1994 FIFA World Cup players
Greek football managers
People from Karditsa (regional unit)
Anagennisi Karditsa F.C. managers
Footballers from Thessaly